The British GT Championship is a sports car racing series based predominantly in the United Kingdom. The series was originally created by the British Racing Drivers' Club in 1993 and, for its first two seasons, was known as the National Sports GT Challenge. The series is currently run by the Stéphane Ratel Organisation, while Pirelli began its first season as the championship's official sole tyre supplier in 2016.

Two classes currently compete in the championship: GT3 and GT4. A consolidation of GT regulations and significant manufacturer support saw British GT first introduce a GT3 class in 2005. The category later mirrored FIA Group GT3 and used near-identical regulations to the FIA GT3 European Championship from 2006 onwards. GT3 rules include extensive Balance of Performance and handicap weights to make cars artificially more equal. Cost-saving measures saw the series' previous premier class, GT2, phased out at the end of 2006.

The SRO GT4 class was adopted in 2008 intended as a development class towards GT3. Regulations governing GT4 ensure the cars more closely resemble their road-going counterparts than GT3 machines, to control cost. This replaced the previous unique-to-British GT GTC category. British GT has featured a number of other classes since its inception, including Group GT1.

Champions
The following drivers have previously won the British GT championships in their respective classes. An overall championship for all classes combined was also awarded until 1998, and those champions are marked with italics.

See also
 British Formula Three Championship

References

External links
 Official British GT website

 
1993 establishments in the United Kingdom
Recurring sporting events established in 1993
National championships in the United Kingdom
Group GT3
GT4 (sports car class)